Qualifications Frameworks in the European Higher Education Area (QF-EHEA) are frameworks describing the higher education qualifications of countries participating in the Bologna Process. National Qualifications Frameworks (NQFs) provide a mapping between higher education qualifications and an overarching framework, allowing the cross-comparison of qualifications from different countries.

The overarching framework was adopted in May 2005 at a meeting of education ministers of the 48 participating countries. It consists of three cycles, approximately equivalent to bachelor's, master's and research doctorates (PhD-equivalent) degrees in the Anglophone world (note that US  first professional degrees such as MD and JD are not PhD-equivalent, even though they are titled "doctorates"). A "short cycle" is also recognised within the first cycle, equivalent to British foundation degrees (US associate degrees).

QF-EHEA in Spain
The NQF in Spain is the Marco Español de Cualificaciones para la Educación Superior (MECES) (Spanish Framework for Higher Education Qualification). This replaced the earlier system of diplomado, licenciado and doctor from 2005, with a transitional period lasting until 2013. The mapping to the EHEA framework is:

QF-EHEA in the United Kingdom
The NQFs linked to the QF-EHEA are the Framework for Higher Education Qualifications (FHEQ) for England, Wales and Northern Ireland and the Framework for Qualifications of Higher Education Institutions in Scotland (FQHEIS). The FQHEIS was certified as being aligned with the QF-EHEA in 2006 and the FHEQ in 2008.

The levels on the two national frameworks, and their mapping to the QF-EHEA, are as follows:

QF-EHEA in the Republic of Ireland
The NFQ for Ireland is the National Framework of Qualifications (NFQ), which spans the full range of educational qualifications available. It was verified as compatible with the EHEA Framework in 2006. The NQF has the following mapping to the EHEA Framework:

References 

Qualifications